Ed Williamson may refer to:
 Ed Williamson (American football)
 Ed Williamson (rugby union)

See also
 Edward Williamson, bishop
 Ned Williamson, baseball player
 Eddie Williamson, American football coach